The Devils Lake Commercial District in Devils Lake, North Dakota is a  historic district that was listed on the National Register of Historic Places in 1989.

It includes architecture by Joseph A. Shannon.  It includes 44 contributing buildings, including the separately NRHP-listed U.S. Post Office and Courthouse and the Bangs-Wineman Block.

Its NRHP nomination describes a John A. Shannon, which appears to be a misstatement of local architect Joseph A. Shannon's name.

References

Commercial buildings on the National Register of Historic Places in North Dakota
Romanesque Revival architecture in North Dakota
Historic districts on the National Register of Historic Places in North Dakota
National Register of Historic Places in Ramsey County, North Dakota